John Peisley (18059 December 1871) was an Australian politician.

He was born in New South Wales to ex-convict farmer John Peisley and publican Elizabeth Boswell. He ran a store in Orange, and on 11 December 1833 married Mary Dean, with whom he had eight children. In 1860 he was elected to the New South Wales Legislative Assembly for Orange, but he resigned in 1862. Peisley died at Orange in 1871.

References

 

1805 births
1871 deaths
Members of the New South Wales Legislative Assembly
19th-century Australian politicians